The 1993–94 season of the División de Honor de Futsal is the 5th season of top-tier futsal in Spain. It was divided in two rounds. First round divided in two groups of 12 teams every one, and second round in which advanced the best 6 team of every group. The 4 last teams of every group played the Permanence round.

Regular season

1st round

Group Par

Group Impar

2nd round

Title – Group Par

Title – Group Impar

Permanence – Group Par

Permanence – Group Impar

Podeprom El Ejido withdrawn of the competition.

Playoffs

See also
División de Honor de Futsal
Futsal in Spain

External links
1993–94 season at lnfs.es

1993 94
Spain
futsal